Pleasant Township is one of the seventeen townships of Logan County, Ohio, United States. As of the 2010 census, the population was 1,147.

Geography
Located in the southwestern part of the county, it borders the following townships:
Bloomfield Township - north
Washington Township - northeast
Harrison Township - east
Union Township - southeast
Miami Township - south
Salem Township, Shelby County - west

Part of the village of DeGraff is located in southern Pleasant Township, and the unincorporated community of Logansville is located in the township's center.

Name and history
Pleasant Township was organized in 1841. It is one of fifteen Pleasant Townships statewide.

Government
The township is governed by a three-member board of trustees, who are elected in November of odd-numbered years to a four-year term beginning on the following January 1. Two are elected in the year after the presidential election and one is elected in the year before it. There is also an elected township fiscal officer, who serves a four-year term beginning on April 1 of the year after the election, which is held in November of the year before the presidential election. Vacancies in the fiscal officership or on the board of trustees are filled by the remaining trustees.

In the elections of November 2007, Stephen Sanders and Joan Downing were elected without opposition to the positions of township trustee and township fiscal officer respectively.

Transportation
Important highways in Pleasant Township are State Routes 47 and 235.

References

External links
County website
County and township map of Ohio
Detailed Logan County map

Townships in Logan County, Ohio
Townships in Ohio
1841 establishments in Ohio
Populated places established in 1841